Calicophoron is a genus of flatworms belonging to the family Paramphistomidae.

The genus has almost cosmopolitan distribution.

Species:

Calicophoron daubneyi 
Calicophoron microbothrioides

References

Platyhelminthes